Most sports in Markham, Ontario are amateur or recreational:

Teams
 Markham Bears Ringette - Provincial & Regional Ringette teams
 Markham Junior Hockey Club
 Markham Mariners - Markham District Rep. Baseball
 Markham Raiders - Markham Minor Football Association
 Markham Stouffville Stars - Girls Hockey Association (L.L.F.H.L.)
 Markham Mariners - Markham Men's Baseball
 Markham Thunder - Markham Minor Lacrosse
 Markham Thunder - Canadian Women's Hockey League
 Markham Ironheads-Ontario Junior B Lacrosse Team
 Markham Waxers - Ontario Provincial Junior A Hockey League (folded 2012)
 Markham Royals - Ontario Provincial Junior A Hockey League
 MUMBA - Markham-Unionville Minor Basketball Association Rep. Program
 Markham Majors - Markham Men's Fastball
 Markham Islanders- Markham Minor Hockey (G.T.H.L. "AA" and "A")
 Markham Majors- Markham Minor Hockey (G.T.H.L. "AAA")
 Markham Irish Canadian Rugby Club - Rugby Ontario Club for competitive youth and adult teams
 Toronto Canada Moose, Based out of the community of Thornhill (Markham/Vaughan) - Greater Metro Junior 'A' Hockey League
 Unionville Spartans - Unionville Minor Softball Association Select Program
 Unionville Jets - Unionville Minor Hockey Association Select Program (Association folded in 2020)
 York Region Raiders- Ontario Varsity Football League

Leagues
 FCCM Basketball Division
 Markham District Baseball Association
 Markham Men's Recreational Hockey
 Markham Regional Ringette Association (MRRA)
 Markham Women's Ringette Association
 Markham Men's Slo-Pitch League
 Markham Woman's Slo-Pitch League
 Markham Unionville Minor Basketball Association (MUMBA)
 Unionville Minor Hockey Association
 Unionville Minor Softball Association
 Unionville Men's Slo-Pitch League
 Unionville Mixed Slo-Pitch League
 Unionville Ladies Slo-Pitch Baseball
 Thornhill Community Hockey League (TCHL)
 Thornhill Baseball Club
 Thornhill Slo-Pitch League

Clubs
 Armadale Tennis Club
 Bluewater Basketball Program
 Markham Aquatic Club
 Markham Cricket Club
 Markham Lawn Bowling Club
 Markham Rugby Club
 Markham Lightning Soccer Club
 Markham Tennis Club
 Thornhill Thunder Soccer Club
 Unionville Curling Club
 Unionville Milliken Soccer Club
 Unionville Tennis Club

Due to the large areas of undeveloped land, Markham has several golf facilities:
 Angus Glen Golf Club- opened 1995
 Bayview Country Club (private) 1960
 Cedar Brae Golf & Country Club (private) - opened 1969 just south of Markham in Toronto and relocated in 1954 from original 1922 course in south Scarborough and again in 1962 from land just west of the current course
 Remington Parkview Golf Club 1997 - southern section of the former IBM Golf Course (c. 1950 as Box Grove Golf and IBM 1967)
 Buttonville Fairways
 Cresthaven Golf Club 1964
 Markham Golf Dome
 Markham Green Golf Club 1997 - northern section of the former IBM Golf Course (c. 1950 as Box Grove Golf and IBM 1967) with rest developed as residential 
 Uplands Golf & Country Club 1922 - reduced size in 1989 due to development
 Upper Unionville Golf Club (renamed in 2018, formerly Mandarin Golf and Country Club (1991-2017) and Windmill Golf Club before 1991

References